Awakening: How Gays and Lesbians Brought Marriage Equality to America is a 2017 book about the history of same-sex marriage in the United States by Nathaniel Frank. It was published by Belknap Press, an imprint of Harvard University Press.

Reviews

External links
Interview in the Windy City Times
Interview in Vice

2017 non-fiction books
2010s LGBT literature
American non-fiction books
Books about LGBT history
Books about same-sex marriage
Books by Nathaniel Frank
English-language books
LGBT literature in the United States
Belknap Press books